This is a list of genera in the orchid family (Orchidaceae), originally according to The Families of Flowering Plants - L. Watson and M. J. Dallwitz. This list is adapted regularly with the changes published in the Orchid Research Newsletter which is published twice a year by the Royal Botanic Gardens, Kew. The most up to date list of accepted; genera, natural nothogenera, species and natural nothospecies with their synonyms can be found on the World Checklist of Selected Plants Families Search Page published by the Royal Botanic Gardens, Kew.  This list is reflected on Wikispecies Orchidaceae and the new eMonocot website Orchidaceae Juss.

This taxonomy undergoes constant change, mainly through evidence from DNA study. Orchids were traditionally defined by morphological similarity (structure of their flowers and other parts). However, recent changes to nomenclature have been driven primarily by DNA studies and also by re-examination of herbarium specimens. This has led to a reduction of genera and species as well as re-circumscription of subfamilies, tribes and subtribes.  Orchid taxonomy is still being revised and each year about another 150 new species are being discovered. The list of genera alone currently stands just short of 1000 entries.

From a cladistic point of view, the orchid family is considered to be monophyletic, i.e. the group incorporates all the taxa derived from an ancestral group.

The taxonomy of the orchids is explained on the page Taxonomy of the orchid family.

Subfamilies 
There are five recognized subfamilies:
 Apostasioideae (two genera, Neuwiedia and Apostasia)
 Cypripedioideae (five genera: Cypripedium, Mexipedium, Paphiopedilum, Phragmipedium and Selenipedium 
 Epidendroideae (has 15,000 species in 576 genera)
 Orchidoideae (7 tribes and 3,630 species; has 2 subclades with tribes Orchideae and Diseae then the other has tribes Cranichideae, Chloraeeae and Diurideae)
 Vanilloideae (15 genera and about 180 species: Tribe Pogonieae (77 species; Cleistes, Cleistesiopsis, Duckeella, Isotria, and Pogonia) also Tribe Vanilleae (with 172 species; Clematepistephium, Cyrtosia, Epistephium, Eriaxis, Erythrorchis, Galeola, Lecanorchis, Pseudovanilla and Vanilla)

Genera

A

Aa
Abdominea
Aberrantia (Luer) Luer (synonym of Acianthera Scheidw.)
Acacallis Lindl. (synonym of Aganisia)
Acampe
Acanthophippium
Aceras
Aceratorchis
Acianthera Scheidw.
Acianthus
Acineta Lindl.
Ackermania
Acoridium
Acostaea Schltr.
Acriopsis
Acrochaene
Acrolophia
Acrorchis
Ada
Adamantinia Van den Berg & C.N.Gonç
Adenochilus
Adenoncos
Adrorhizon
Aerangis
Aeranthes
Aerides Lour.: fox brush orchid
Aganisia
Aglossorrhyncha
Agrostophyllum
Alamania
Alatiliparis: new genus with 2 species, discovered in Sumatra, Indonesia
Altensteinia
Amblyanthe
Amblostoma Scheidw.
Ambrella
Amerorchis: round-leaf orchid
Amesiella
Amoana
Amparoa
Amphigena 
Anacamptis Rich.
Anacheilium Withner & P.A.Harding
Anathallis
Ancipitia
Ancistrochilus Rolfe
Ancistrorhynchus
Angraecopsis
Angraecum bory
Anguloa
Ania
Anoectochilus: jeweled orchid
Ansellia Lindl.
Anteriorchis (synonym of Anacamptis)
Anthogonium
Anthosiphon
Antilla
Antillanorchis
Aorchis
Aphyllorchis
Aplectrum Nuttall: Adam and Eve
Apoda-prorepentia
Aporostylis
Aporum
Apostasia Blume
Appendicula
Aracamunia
Arachnis Blume
Arachnites
Archineottia
Areldia
Arethusa: dragon's mouth
Armodorum
Arnottia
Arpophyllum
Arthrochilus
Artorima
Arundina Blume: bamboo orchid
Ascidieria
Ascocentrum
Ascochilopsis
Ascochilus
Ascoglossum
Ascolabium
Aspasia
Aspidogyne
Atopoglossum
Aulosepalum
Auxopus
Azadehdelia (synonym of Cribbia Senghas)

B

Baptistonia Barb.Rodr.
Barbosella
Barbrodria
Barkeria
Barlia
Bartholina
Basigyne
Basiphyllaea: crab orchid
Baskervilla
Batemannia
Beclardia
Beloglottis
Benthamia
Benzingia
Bhutanthera 
Bidoupia
Biermannia
Bifrenaria Lindl.
Binotia
Bipinnula
Bletia Ruiz and Pavon: pine-pink
Bletilla Rchb.F.: urn orchid
Bogoria
Bolbidium
Bollea Rchb.F.
Bolusiella
Bonatea Willd.
Bonniera
Brachionidium: cup orchid
Brachtia
Brachycorythis Lindl.
Brachypeza
Brachystele
Bracisepalum
Braemia
Brassavola R.Br.: daddy-long-legs
Brassia: cricket orchid
Brenesia
Briegeria
Bromheadia
Broughtonia R.Br. 
Brownleea
Bryobium
Buchtienia
Bulbophyllum Thouars: rat-tail orchid
Bulleyia
Burnettia
Burnsbaloghia

C
Cadetia Gaudich.
Caladenia R.Br.

Calanthe R.Br.
Caleana R.Br.
Callostylis
Calochilus R.Br.: bearded orchids
Calopogon R.Br.: grasspink
Caluera
Calymmanthera
Calypso Salisb.: fairy-slipper orchid
Calyptrochilum
Camaridium
Campanulorchis
Campylocentrum: bent-spur orchid
Capanemia
Cardiochilos
Catasetum
Cattleya Lindl.
Cattleyella Van den Berg & M.W.Chase
Cattleyopsis Lemaire
Caucaea
Caularthron Raf.
Centroglossa
Centrostigma Schltr.
Cephalanthera Rich.: some helleborines, phantom orchid
Cephalantheropsis
Ceraia
Ceratandra
Ceratocentron
Ceratochilus
Ceratostylis Blume
Chamaeangis
Chamaeanthus
Chamaegastrodia
Chamelophyton
Chamorchis
Changnienia
Chaseella
Chaubardia
Chaubardiella
Chauliodon
Cheiradenia
Cheirostylis
Chelonistele
Chelyorchis
Chiloglottis R.Br.
Chilopogon
Chiloschista Lindl.
Chiloterus
Chitonanthera
Chitonochilus
Chloraea
Chondradenia
Chondrorhyncha Lindl.
Christensonella 
Chroniochilus
Chrysocycnis
Chrysoglossum
Chusua
Chysis Lindl.
Chytroglossa
Cirrhaea Lindl.
Cirrhopetalum
Cischweinfia
Claderia
Cleisocentron
Cleisomeria
Cleisostoma Blume
Cleistes
Cleistesiopsis rosebud orchid
Clematepistephium
Clowesia Lindl.
Coccineorchis
Cochleanthes Raf.: fan-shape orchid
Cochlioda Lindl.
Cocleorchis
Codonorchis
Codonosiphon
Coelia Lindl.
Coeliopsis
Coeloglossum: frog orchid
Coelogyne Lindl.
Coilochilus
Coilostylis Withner & P.A.Harding
Collabium
Colombiana
Comparettia Poepp. & Endl.: snail orchid
Comperia
Conchidium
Condylago Luer
Constantia
Corallorhiza (Haller) Chatelaine: coral root
Cordiglottis
Corunastylis
Coryanthes Hook.: bucket orchids
Corybas Salisb.
Corycium
Corymborkis: crow orchid
Corysanthes
Cottonia
Cotylolabium
Cranichis: helmet orchid
Cremastra
Crepidium 
Cribbia
Crocodeilanthe
Crossoglossa
Cryptarrhena
Cryptocentrum
Cryptochilus
Cryptopus
Cryptopylos
Cryptostylis R.Br.
Cucumeria
Cuitlauzina
Cyanaeorchis
Cyanicula 
Cybebus
Cyclopogon: ladies'-tresses
Cycnoches Lindl.: swan orchids
Cylindrolobus
Cymbidiella Rolfe
Cymbidium Sw.
Cymboglossum
Cynorkis Thouars
Cyphochilus
Cypholoron
Cypripedium L.: lady's slipper
Cyrtidiorchis
Cyrtochilum 
Cyrtopodium R.Br.: cow-horn orchid
Cyrtorchis Schltr.
Cyrtosia
Cyrtostylis
Cystorchis

D

Dactylorchis
Dactylorhiza: key flower
Dactylorhynchus
Dactylostalix
Degranvillea
Deiregyne
Demorchis
Dendrobium
Dendrochilum
Dendrolirium 
Dendrophylax
Devogelia
Diadenium
Diaphananthe
Diceratostele
Dicerostylis
Dichaea: leafy-stem orchid, leaf-stem orchid
Dichromanthus
Dickasonia
Dictyophyllaria
Didactylus
Didiciea
Didymoplexiella
Didymoplexiopsis 
Didymoplexis
Dienia 
Diglyphosa
Dignathe
Dilochia
Dilochiopsis
Dilomilis: parrot-beak orchid
Dimerandra
Dimorphorchis
Dinema
Dinklageella
Diothonea
Diphylax
Diplandrorchis
Diplocaulobium
Diplocentrum
Diplolabellum
Diplomeris
Diploprora
Dipodium
Dipteranthus
Dipterostele
Disa
Discyphus
Disperis
Disticholiparis Marg. & Szlach
Distylodon
Diteilis
Dithyridanthus
Diuris
Dockrillia Briegar, 1981
Dodsonia
Dolichocentrum
Domingoa: Mona
Doritis
Dossinia
Dracontia
Dracula
Drakaea
Dresslerella
Dressleria
Dryadella
Dryadorchis
Drymoanthus
Drymoda
Duckeella
Dunstervillea
Dyakia

E

Earina
Eggelingia
Eleorchis
Elleanthus: tiger orchid, praying-virgin
Elongatia
Eloyella
Eltroplectris: long-claw orchid
Elythranthera
Embreea
Empusa
Empusella (Luer) Luer
Encheiridion
Encyclia Hook.: butterfly orchid
Entomophobia
Eparmatostigma
Ephippianthus
Epibator Luer
Epiblastus
Epiblema
Epicranthes
Epidanthus
Epidendrum: star orchid
Epigeneium
Epilyna
Epipactis: helleborine
Epipogium
Epistephium
Eria
Eriaxis
Ericksonella
Eriochilus
Eriodes
Eriopexis
Eriopsis
Erycina
Erythrodes: false helmet orchids
Erythrorchis
Esmeralda
Euanthe
Eucosia
Eulophia: Wildcoco
Eulophiella
Euphlebium
Euryblema Dressler (2005)
Eurycaulis
Eurycentrum
Eurychone
Eurystyles: custard orchid
Evotella

F

Fernandezia
Ferruminaria
Fimbriella
Fimbrorchis
Flickingeria
Frigidorchis 
Frondaria
Fuertesiella
Funkiella

G

Galeandra: hooded orchid
Galearis: showy orchid
Galeola
Galeottia
Galeottiella
Garaya
Gastrochilus
Gastrodia
Gastrorchis
Gavilea
Geesinkorchis
Gennaria
Genoplesium
Genyorchis
Geoblasta
Geodorum
Glomera
Glossodia
Glossorhyncha
Gomesa
Gomphichis
Gonatostylis
Gongora
Goniochilus
Goodyera: rattlesnake plantain
Govenia: govenia
Gracielanthus
Grammangis
Grammatophyllum
Graphorkis Thou.
Grastidium
Greenwoodiella
Grobya
Grosourdya
Guarianthe Dressler & W.E.Higgins
Gunnarella
Gunnarorchis
Gymnadenia: fragrant orchid
Gymnadeniopsis
Gymnochilus
Gynoglottis

H

Habenaria: bog orchid, false rein orchid
Hagsatera
Hammarbya
Hancockia
Hapalochilus
Hapalorchis
Haraella
Harrisella: airplant orchid
Hederorkis
Helcia
Helleriella: dotted orchid
Helonoma
Hemipilia
Herminium
Herpetophytum
Herpysma
Herschelianthe
Hetaeria
Heterotaxis
Heterozeuxine
Hexalectris: crested coralroot
Hexisea
Himantoglossum
Hintonella
Hippeophyllum
Hirtzia
Hispaniella
Hoehneella
Hoffmannseggella
Hofmeisterella
Holcoglossum
Holmesia
Holopogon
Holothrix
Homalopetalum
Horichia
Hormidium
Horvatia
Houlletia
Huntleya
Huttonaea
Hybochilus
Hydrorchis 
Hygrochilus
Hylophila
Hymenorchis

I

Imerinaea
Imerinorchis Szlach (2005)
Inobulbon
Ione
Ionopsis: violet orchid
Ipsea
Isabelia
Ischnocentrum
Ischnogyne
Isochilus: equal-lip orchid
Isotria: fiveleaf orchid
Ixyophora Dressler (2005)

J
Jacquiniella: tufted orchid
Jejosephia
Jonesiopsis
Jostia
Jumellea

K

Kalimpongia
Kaurorchis
Kefersteinia
Kegeliella
Kerigomnia
Kinetochilus
Kingidium
Kionophyton
Koellensteinia: grass-leaf orchid
Konantzia
Kraenzlinella 
Kreodanthus
Kryptostoma
Kuhlhasseltia

L

Lacaena
Laelia Lindl.
Laeliopsis
Lanium
Lankesterella
Leaoa
Lecanorchis
Lemboglossum
Lemurella
Lemurorchis
Leochilus: smooth-lip orchid
Lepanthes: babyboot orchid
Lepanthopsis: tiny orchid
Lepidogyne
Leporella
Leptotes
Lesliea
Leucohyle
Ligeophila
Limodorum
Lindleyalis
Liparis: wide-lip orchid
Listrostachys
Lockhartia
Loefgrenianthus
Ludisia: jewel orchid
Lueddemannia
Luisia
Lycaste: bee orchid
Lycomormium
Lyperanthus
Lyroglossa

M

Macodes
Macradenia: long-gland orchid
Macroclinium
Macropodanthus
Malaxis: adder's mouth orchid
Malleola
Manniella
Margelliantha
Masdevallia
Mastigion
Maxillaria: tiger orchid, flame orchid
Mecopodum
Mediocalcar
Megalorchis
Megalotus
Megastylis
Meiracyllium
Meliorchis: extinct, 80-million-year-old orchid
Mendoncella
Mesadenella
Mesadenus: ladies'-tresses
Mesospinidium
Mexicoa
Microchilus
Microcoelia
Micropera
Microphytanthe
Microsaccus
Microtatorchis
Microterangis
Microthelys
Microtis
Miltonia Lindl.: pansy orchid
Miltoniopsis
Mischobulbum
Mixis
Mobilabium
Moerenhoutia
Monadenia
Monanthos
Monomeria
Monophyllorchis
Monosepalum
Mormodes
Mormolyca
Mycaranthes
Myoxanthus
Myrmechila D.L.Jones & M.A.Clem (2005)
Myrmechis
Myrmecophila
Myrosmodes
Mystacidium

N

Nabaluia
Nageliella
Nematoceras
Neobathiea
Neobenthamia
Neobolusia
Neoclemensia
Neocogniauxia
Neodryas
Neoescobaria
Neofinetia
Neogardneria
Neogyna
Neomoorea
Neotinea
Neottia (including Listera)
Neowilliamsia
Nephelaphyllum
Nephrangis
Nervilia
Neuwiedia
Nidema: fairy orchid
Nigritella
Nitidobulbon 
Nohawilliamsia
Nothodoritis
Nothostele
Notylia

O

Oberonia
Oberonioides 
Octarrhena
Octomeria
Odontochilus
Odontoglossum Kunth
Odontorrhynchus
Oeceoclades: monk orchid
Oeonia
Oeoniella
Oerstedella
Oestlundorchis
Olgasis
Oligochaetochilus
Oligophyton
Oliveriana
Omoea
Oncidium: dancing-lady orchid
Ophidion
Ophrys: ophrys
Orchipedum
Orchis: orchis
Oreorchis
Orestias
Orleanesia
Ornithidium 
Ornithocephalus
Ornithochilus
Orthoceras
Osmoglossum
Ossiculum
Osyricera
Otochilus
Otoglossum
Otostylis
Oxystophyllum

P

Pabstia Garay
Pachites
Pachyphyllum
Pachyplectron
Pachystele
Pachystoma
Palmorchis
Panisea
Pantlingia
Paphinia
Paphiopedilum 
Papilionanthe
Papillilabium
Paphiopedilum: Venus' slipper
Papperitzia
Papuaea
Paradisanthus
Paralophia P.J.Cribb & Hermans (2005)
Paraphalaenopsis
Parapteroceras
Pecteilis
Pedilochilus
Pedilonum
Pelatantheria
Pelexia: hachuela
Penkimia 
Pennilabium
Peristeranthus
Peristeria
Peristylus
Pescatoria
Phaius: nun's-hood orchid
Phalaenopsis: moth orchid
Pheladenia
Pholidota 
Phoringopsis 
Phragmipedium
Phragmorchis
Phreatia
Phymatidium
Physoceras
Physogyne
Pilophyllum
Pinelia
Piperia: rein orchid
Pityphyllum
Platanthera: fringed orchid, bog orchid
Platantheroides
Platycoryne
Platyglottis
Platylepis
Platyrhiza
Platystele
Platythelys: jug orchid
Plectorrhiza
Plectrelminthus
Plectrophora
Pleione
Pleurothallis: bonnet orchid
Pleurothallopsis
Plexaure 
Plocoglottis
Poaephyllum
Podangis
Podochilus
Pogonia: snake-mouth orchid
Pogoniopsis
Polycycnis
Polyotidium
Polyradicion: palmpolly
Polystachya
Pomatocalpa
Ponera
Ponerorchis
Ponthieva: shadow witch
Porpax
Porphyrodesme
Porphyroglottis
Porphyrostachys
Porroglossum
Porrorhachis
Potosia 
Prasophyllum
Prescottia: Prescott orchid
Pristiglottis
Proctoria
Promenaea
Prosthechea
Pseudacoridium
Pseuderia
Pseudocentrum
Pseudocranichis
Pseudoeurystyles
Pseudogoodyera
Pseudolaelia
Pseudorchis
Pseudovanilla
Psilochilus: ragged-lip orchid
Psychilis: peacock orchid
Psychopsiella (sometimes included in Psychopsis)
Psychopsis: butterfly orchid
Psygmorchis
Pterichis
Pteroceras
Pteroglossa
Pteroglossaspis: giant orchid
Pterostemma
Pterostylis
Pterygodium
Pygmaeorchis
Pyrorchis

Q
Quekettia
Quisqueya

R

Rangaeris
Rauhiella
Raycadenco
Reichenbachanthus
Renanthera Lour.
Renantherella
Restrepia
Restrepiella
Restrepiopsis
Rhaesteria
Rhamphorhynchus
Rhinerrhiza
Rhetinantha 
Rhipidorchis
Rhipidoglossum 
Rhizanthella
Rhomboda 
Rhynchogyna
Rhyncholaelia
Rhynchophreatia
Rhynchostele
Rhynchostylis
Rhytionanthos
Ridleyella
Rimacola
Risleya
Robiquetia
Rodriguezia Ruiz & Pav.
Rodrigueziella
Rodrigueziopsis
Roezliella
Roeperocharis
Rossioglossum
Rubellia (Luer) Luer (2004)
Rudolfiella
Rusbyella

S

Saccoglossum
Saccolabiopsis
Saccolabium
Sacoila: terrestrial orchid
Salacistis
Salpistele
Sanderella
Sarcanthopsis
Sarcochilus
Sarcoglottis
Sarcoglyphis
Sarcophyton
Sarcorhynchus
Sarcostoma
Satyridium
Satyrium
Saundersia
Sauroglossum
Sauvetrea 
Scaphosepalum
Scaphyglottis: Malaysian orchid
Scelochiloides
Scelochilus
Schiedeella
Schistotylus
Schizochilus
Schizodium
Schlimia
Schoenorchis
Schomburgkia
Schunkea
Schwartzkopffia
Scuticaria
Sedirea
Seegeriella
Seidenfadenia
Seidenfia 
Sepalosiphon
Serapias
Sertifera
Sievekingia
Sigmatostalix
Silvorchis
Sinorchis
Sirhookera
Skeptrostachys
Smithsonia
Smitinandia
Sobennikoffia
Sobralia
Solenangis
Solenidiopsis
Solenidium
Solenocentrum
Sophronitella
Sophronitis
Soterosanthus
Sotoa
Spathoglottis: ground orchid
Specklinia Lindl. (1830)
Sphyrarhynchus
Sphyrastylis
Stichorkis
Spiculaea
Spilotantha

Spiranthes: ladies'-tresses
Stalkya
Stanhopea
Staurochilus
Stelis: leach orchid
Stellilabium
Stenia
Stenocoryne
Stenoglottis
Stenoptera
Stenorrhynchos: ladies'-tresses
Stephanothelys
Stereochilus
Stereosandra
Steveniella
Stictophyllum
Stigmatodactylus
Stigmatosema
Stolzia
Suarezia
Summerhayesia
Sunipia
Sutrina
Svenkoeltzia
Symphyglossum
Synanthes
Synarmosepalum
Systeloglossum
Sampaguita

T

Taeniophyllum
Taeniorrhiza
Tainia
Talpinaria
Tamayorkis
Tangtsinia
Tapeinoglossum
Taprobanea
Teagueia
Telipogon
Tetragamestus
Tetramicra: wallflower orchid
Teuscheria
Thaia
Thecopus
Thecostele
Thelasis
Thelychiton
Thelymitra
Thelyschista
Thrixspermum
Thulinia
Thunia
Thysanoglossa
Ticoglossum
Tipularia: crippled-cranefly
Tolumnia: dancing-lady orchid, variegated orchid
Tomzanonia
Townsonia
Trachyrhizum
Traunsteinera
Trevoria
Trias
Tribulago
Triceratorhynchus
Trichocentrum
Trichoceros
Trichoglottis
Trichopilia
Trichosalpinx: bonnet orchid
Trichosma
Trichotosia
Tridactyle
Trigonidium
Triphora: noddingcaps
Trisetella
Trizeuxis
Tropidia: palm orchid
Trudelia
Tsaiorchis
Tuberolabium
Tubilabium
Tulotis
Tylostigma

U
Uleiorchis
Uncifera
Unciferia
Urostachya

V

Vanda
Vandopsis
Vanilla: vanilla
Vargasiella
Vasqueziella
Ventricularia
Vesicisepalum
Vexillabium
Vitekorchis
Vrydagzynea

W

Wallnoeferia
Warmingia
Warrea
Warczewiczella 
Warreella
Warreopsis
Warscaea
Winika M.Clements et al., 1997
Wullschlaegelia: leafless orchid

X
Xenikophyton
Xenosia
Xerorchis
Xiphosium
Xylobium

Y
Yoania
Ypsilopus
Ypsilorchis

Z
Zelenkoa M.W.Chase & N.H.Williams
Zeuxine: soldier's orchid
Zhukowskia
Zootrophion
Zygopetalum Hook.
Zygosepalum Rchb.f.
Zygostates

References 

The International Code of Botanical Nomenclature (ICBN) (2000).
Dressler, R.L. (1993). Phylogeny and Classification of the Orchid Family. Cambridge Univ. Press
Pridgeon, A.M., Cribb, P.J., Chase, M.A. & Rasmussen, F. eds. (1999). Genera Orchidacearum 1. Oxford Univ. Press.
Pridgeon, A.M., Cribb, P.J., Chase, M.A. & Rasmussen, F. eds. (2001). Genera Orchidacearum 2. Oxford Univ. Press.
Pridgeon, A.M., Cribb, P.J., Chase, M.A. & Rasmussen, F. eds. (2003). Genera Orchidacearum 3. Oxford Univ. Press.
Berg Pana, H. 2005. Handbuch der Orchideen-Namen. Dictionary of Orchid Names. Dizionario dei nomi delle orchidee. Ulmer, Stuttgart
Pridgeon, A.M., Cribb, P.J., Chase, M.A. & Rasmussen, F. eds. (2006). Genera Orchidacearum 4. Oxford Univ. Press.
Pridgeon, A.M., Cribb, P.J., Chase, M.A. & Rasmussen, F. eds. (2009). Genera Orchidacearum 5. Oxford Univ. Press

External links 
All recognized monocotiledons species (including Orchid family) - World Checklist of Selected Plant Families, Kew Botanic Garden - UK
Intergeneric orchid genus names (updated 11 Jan 2005)
List of orchid genera (updated 14 Jul 2004)
List of common names or 
List of orchid hybrids - Royal Horticultural Society - UK
Orchid main page - eMonocot website

 
 
Orchidaceae